Jaime Nielsen (born 3 September 1985) is a New Zealand track and road cyclist, and a former representative rower.

Career
From 2003 to 2007, Nielsen competed with the national rowing team. She became world champion at the World Rowing U23 Championships in Poznań, Poland, in 2004 with the U23 women's quadruple sculls with fellow members Bess Halley, Darnelle Timbs and Fiona Paterson.

Despite only taking up cycling in 2007, at the team pursuit at the UCI Track Cycling World Championships she won silver in 2009 and bronze in 2011.

At the 2012 Summer Olympics, she competed in the Women's team pursuit for the New Zealand team which placed 5th and set a national record of 3:18.514. At the 2016 Summer Olympics, she finished 4th in the Women's team pursuit. At the 2020 Summer Olympics, she finished eighth, in Women's team pursuit.

Nielsen won the New Zealand National Time Trial Championships in 2014 and was second from 2011 to 2013.

Major results

Track

2009
 2nd  Team pursuit, UCI Track Cycling World Championships
2010
 3rd  Team pursuit, 2010–11 UCI Track Cycling World Cup Classics, Melbourne
2011
 2nd  Team pursuit, 2010–11 UCI Track Cycling World Cup Classics, Manchester
 UCI Track Cycling World Championships
3rd  Team pursuit
4th Individual pursuit
2013
 1st  Individual pursuit, National Track Championships
 2nd Omnium, Invercargill
2014
 Oceania Track Championships
1st  Team pursuit (with Lauren Ellis, Racquel Sheath and Georgia Williams)
3rd  Individual pursuit
 3rd Points race, BikeNZ Cup
2015
 1st  Individual pursuit, National Track Championships
2016
 1st  Individual pursuit, National Track Championships
 2nd  Individual pursuit, Oceania Track Championships

Road

2011
 2nd Time trial, National Road Championships
2012
 2nd Time trial, National Road Championships
2013
 2nd Time trial, National Road Championships
2014
 1st  Time trial, National Road Championships
 4th Time trial, Commonwealth Games
2015
 1st  Time trial, National Road Championships
 3rd Ljubljana–Domžale–Ljubljana TT
 9th Chrono Champenois
 10th Giro del Trentino Alto Adige-Südtirol
2016
 2nd Time trial, National Road Championships
2017
 1st  Time trial, National Road Championships
2021
 2nd Time trial, National Road Championships

References

External links
 

Living people
1985 births
New Zealand female cyclists
Olympic cyclists of New Zealand
Cyclists at the 2012 Summer Olympics
Cyclists at the 2016 Summer Olympics
New Zealand track cyclists
Cyclists at the 2010 Commonwealth Games
Sportspeople from Hamilton, New Zealand
Cyclists at the 2014 Commonwealth Games
Commonwealth Games competitors for New Zealand
New Zealand female rowers
Cyclists at the 2020 Summer Olympics
University of Waikato alumni
Massey University alumni
21st-century New Zealand women